is a near-Earth object of the Atira group.

Discovery
 was discovered at G=20.4 mag on 2020 April 28 by the Mount Lemmon Survey using the 0.5 m reflector + 10 K CCD.

Orbit and classification 

It orbits the Sun at a distance of 0.7–0.9 AU once every 9 months (271 days; semi-major axis of 0.82 AU). Its orbit has an eccentricity of 0.15 and an unusually high inclination of 50° with respect to the ecliptic.

The orbital evolution of  leads the object into the  Aten orbital realm periodically.

References

External links 
 
 

Minor planet object articles (unnumbered)
Discoveries by MLS
20200428